Preparata may refer to:

Preparata code, a non-linear double-error-correcting code
Franco P. Preparata, Italian computer scientist
Giuliano Preparata (1942–2000), Italian physicist